"Jigga That Nigga" is a song by the American rapper Jay-Z. It was the third single from his sixth studio album, The Blueprint. It has additional vocals from Stephanie Miller and Michelle Mills but they are not credited as featuring. In the US, the song peaked at #66 on the Hot 100. In recent years, his nickname "jigga" has become synonymous with being "fresh, fly" and "stylish."

Credits and personnel
The credits for "Jigga That Nigga" are adapted from the liner notes of The Blueprint.
Studio locations
 Mastered at Masterdisk, New York City, New York.
 Mixed and recorded at Baseline Studios, New York City, New York.

Personnel
 Jay-Z – songwriting, vocals
 Trackmasters – production, songwriting
 Young Guru – recording
 Shane Woodley – recording assistant
 Jason Goldstein – mixing
 Stephanie Miller – additional vocals
 Michelle Mills – additional vocals
 Tony Dawsey – mastering

Charts

Release history

References

Jay-Z songs
2002 singles
Songs written by Jay-Z